Kaio Nunes Ferreira (born 1 October 1996), known as Kaio Nunes or simply Kaio, is a Brazilian professional footballer who plays as a forward for Brusque, on loan from Centro Sportivo Alagoano.

Professional career
Kaio made his professional debut with Brasil de Pelotas in a 2-2 Campeonato Brasileiro Série B tie with Avaí FC on 21 April 2018.

Career statistics

References

External links
 Futebol de Goyaz profile 
 

1996 births
Living people
Footballers from Brasília
Brazilian footballers
Association football forwards
Campeonato Brasileiro Série A players
Campeonato Brasileiro Série B players
Campeonato Brasileiro Série D players
Brasília Futebol Clube players
Goianésia Esporte Clube players
Grêmio Esportivo Brasil players
Goiás Esporte Clube players
Associação Chapecoense de Futebol players